Horse Girl is a 2020 American psychological drama film directed and produced by Jeff Baena, from a screenplay written by Baena and Alison Brie. It stars Brie, Debby Ryan, John Reynolds, Molly Shannon, John Ortiz, and Paul Reiser.

The film had its world premiere at the Sundance Film Festival on January 27, 2020. It was released on February 7, 2020, by Netflix.

Plot

Sarah is a shy, introverted young woman who lives quietly and works at a crafts store. In her spare time she visits her mother's grave, who died by suicide the year before. She also frequents the horse stable where her former horse Willow is boarded, and where she rode in her childhood; Sarah's recurrent visits visibly annoy the owners.

On Sarah's birthday, she tries to ask her Zumba class instructor to go out but is unsuccessful. When her roommate Nikki finds her home alone, she invites Darren, her boyfriend Brian's roommate, over for a double date. The four smoke marijuana and have drinks. Sarah listens eagerly as Darren reveals details about himself and his past relationship, but the date is interrupted by her nose bleed. After Darren leaves, Sarah has a bizarre dream in which she is lying in a white room with a man and woman also lying down some distance away from her, unaware of their surroundings.

The following morning, Nikki awakens to find Sarah sleeping on the living room floor and large scratch marks running across the wall. Darren returns to the apartment to retrieve his car and asks Sarah on a date. At work, she has another nose bleed. While recovering, she recognizes a man walking outside who resembles the one from her dream. Later, Sarah spends an afternoon with her childhood friend Heather who suffered a traumatic brain injury in a riding accident causing her recurrent seizures and short term memory loss.

A series of bizarre incidents soon befall Sarah. While driving home, she stops at a red light near a water facility then finds herself in her kitchen with the tap running, unable to account for the elapsed time. She hears a woman talking indistinctly in another room when no one is home. She finds her car has been stolen from her garage.

Gary, Sarah's wealthy stepfather, notifies her the car has appeared at a tow yard as the registration is still in his name. He brings her to retrieve it, and the tow driver informs them the car was abandoned near a water facility in the middle of the road.

Later, Sarah apparently sleepwalks out of her apartment and awakens standing on a sidewalk with an unexplained time loss. Her boss, Joan, suggests she visit a doctor given her familial history of mental health problems.

Sarah becomes convinced she is experiencing alien abductions and might be a clone, the latter triggered by a subplot in Purgatory, a fantasy television series she watches regularly. Due to her striking resemblance to her deceased grandmother, Sarah fears she may be her clone. Meanwhile, she tracks the man from her dream, Ron, to a plumbing store that he owns. While on a date with Darren, Sarah manically confides her belief that she is a clone and has him drive her to her mother's grave to dig her up and retrieve her DNA. When Darren becomes disturbed, Sarah accuses him of plotting against her, and threatens him with scissors, forcing him to leave her there.

Sarah takes a shower at home, and after stepping out of the shower door finds herself instead walking through the back door to her work. Joan helps her and calls the police, after which she is admitted to a psychiatric hospital. There, she recognizes another patient as the woman from her dream; when Sarah describes it, the woman reveals that they share elements in their dreams, such as an alien ramp in the middle of the ocean. Sarah takes this as confirmation of her belief that they are both alien abductees and soon joyfully tells her social worker that she is not delusional. Despite the social worker's reservations, Sarah is discharged after 72 hours.

At home, Sarah dresses in her grandmother's dress. She covertly steals Willow from the stable and walks with her into the woods. In a clearing, Sarah stops and lies on the ground. Moments later, a spaceship appears; she levitates toward the sky and disappears.

Cast

Production
In June 2019, it was announced Alison Brie would star in the film, with Jeff Baena directing from a screenplay he wrote with Brie. Jay Duplass and Mark Duplass serve as executive producers under their Duplass Brothers Productions banner, with Netflix distributing.

Release
The film had its world premiere at the Sundance Film Festival on January 27, 2020. It was released on February 7, 2020, by Netflix.

Reception
The site's critical consensus reads: "Horse Girl proves unwilling or unable to explore the deeper themes it addresses, but this unusual drama is anchored by Alison Brie's committed performance." According to Metacritic, which sampled 17 critics and calculated a weighted average score of 61 out of 100, the film received "generally favorable reviews".

Nick Allen of RogerEbert.com reviewed the film out of its world premiere at the Sundance Film Festival. In a 3-star review: "The sincerity that Brie brings to her full-fledged embodiment of mental illness is major, and in turn helps Horse Girl overcome its tricky storytelling."

See also
 Mental disorders in film
 Mental illness in fiction
 Schizophrenia

References

External links
 
 
 

2020 films
2020 drama films
2020 independent films
2020s American films
2020s English-language films
2020s psychological drama films
Alien abduction films
American independent films
American psychological drama films
Duplass Brothers Productions films
English-language Netflix original films
Films about cloning
Films about dreams
Films about horses
Films about mental health
Films directed by Jeff Baena
Insomnia in film
Time loop films